Anthony Andeh (16 August 1945 – 12 May 2010) was a Nigerian boxer. He competed in the men's featherweight event at the 1964 Summer Olympics, and then won the gold medal in the lightweight event at the 1966 Commonwealth Games in Kingston, Jamaica. At the 1964 Summer Olympics, he defeated Badawi El-Bedewi of Egypt, before losing to Tin Tun of Burma.

References

External links

1945 births
2010 deaths
Nigerian male boxers
Olympic boxers of Nigeria
Boxers at the 1964 Summer Olympics
Boxers at the 1966 British Empire and Commonwealth Games
Commonwealth Games gold medallists for Nigeria
Commonwealth Games medallists in boxing
Lightweight boxers
Medallists at the 1966 British Empire and Commonwealth Games